Hall Summit is a village in Red River Parish, Louisiana, United States. The population was 264 at the 2000 census.

Geography

Demographics

As of the census of 2013, there were 264 people, 101 households, and 75 families residing in the village. The racial makeup of the village was 90.53% White and 9.47% African American. Hispanic or Latino of any race were 1.52% of the population.

There were 101 households, out of which 35.6% had children under the age of 18 living with them, 54.5% were married couples living together, 15.8% had a female householder with no husband present, and 24.8% were non-families. 21.8% of all households were made up of individuals, and 9.9% had someone living alone who was 65 years of age or older. The average household size was 2.61 and the average family size was 3.04.

In the village, the population was spread out, with 28.0% under the age of 18, 4.5% from 18 to 24, 29.9% from 25 to 44, 18.9% from 45 to 64, and 18.6% who were 65 years of age or older. The median age was 37 years. For every 100 females, there were 101.5 males. For every 100 females age 18 and over, there were 95.9 males.

The median income for a household in the village was $31,042, and the median income for a family was $30,000. Males had a median income of $24,821 versus $25,000 for females. The per capita income for the village was $11,433. About 24.3% of families and 24.5% of the population were below the poverty line, including 34.6% of those under the age of eighteen and 23.7% of those 65 or over.

The Hall Summit mayor is Lary Wimberly; the village council consists of Barbara Moore, Antony Thomas, and Kathy Quick.

Education
Hall Summit and all of Red River Parish are served by the Red River Parish School District. Zoned campuses include Red River Elementary School (Grades PK-5), Red River Junior High School (Grades 6-8), and Red River Senior High School (Grades 9-12).

Riverdale Academy, the only K-12 private school in Red River Parish, is located outside the parish seat of Coushatta.

Notable person
 Clint Courtney, major league baseball player

References

Villages in Louisiana
Villages in Red River Parish, Louisiana
Populated places in Ark-La-Tex